The Cats of Seroster is a children's fantasy novel by Robert Westall, published in 1984 by Pan Books. The novel is set in "vaguely medieval France" and is told in part from the perspective of domestic cats.

Plot summary
Eighteen-year-old Cam is tricked into completing an errand in the distant city of Seroster. Once there he gets mixed up in dangerous palace intrigue.

Reception
The novel received a dour reception. The Kirkus magazine concluded: "Despite some vividly imagined cat-world vignettes, then: a dense, demanding fable with only minor rewards."

References

British children's novels
Children's fantasy novels
1984 British novels
1984 children's books
British fantasy novels
British children's books
Novels about cats
Macmillan Publishers books